Banta is a small unincorporated community in San Joaquin County, California. Originally known as the village of San Joaquin Valley in the 1840s, the town was served by the McCloud Stage Company as the last stop for passengers before heading over the Altamont Pass on the road between Stockton and the Bay Area.

The stage stop spawned the Elk Horn Inn, which served thirsty travelers and local farmers. Expanded by owner Ransom Chamberlain in 1853 to include a two-story hotel, restaurant and bar, the inn was renamed “The White House.” In 1863, Henry Banta bought the inn from Chamberlain and changed the sign on the awning to read “Banta’s White House.” Soon, local residents, travelers and teamsters began calling the settlement “Bantas,” and the town began appearing on maps and stagecoach schedules under that name. 

In 1869, Bantas became a whistle stop for freight and passengers on the newly completed Western Pacific Railroad, which later became part of the Southern Pacific Railroad. 

Banta was located on the route of the transcontinental railroad from Sacramento to the San Francisco Bay Area by way of the Altamont Pass and Niles Canyon before the Central Pacific bought the route of the California Pacific which ran north of the Carquinez Strait to Vallejo. In the late 1870s, the Central Pacific diverted the California Pacific line to Benicia, California and established a railroad ferry between Benicia and Port Costa across the Carquinez Strait. 

Meanwhile, the railroad chose to extend a branch line – the San Pablo and Tulare Extension Railroad – from Benicia and Port Costa to Tracy Junction instead of Banta in 1878, a decision which led to the creation of the current city of Tracy and relegated Banta to secondary status as a village at the far eastern edge of the railroad's yards. The San Pablo and Tulare extension was later incorporated into the Southern Pacific.

Banta's original Southern Pacific Railroad depot was torn down and moved to Benicia in 1902. It remains standing in Benicia, where it currently serves as a visitor center.

Steve Perry, former lead singer of the band Journey, once called Banta his home. His Alien Project rock group formed here in the mid-1970s.

Banta's ZIP Code is 95304, and the community is inside area code 209.

Landmarks

Banta's historical sites include the Banta Inn, established in 1879. The Inn is well known in the area because some local residents believe it to be haunted.

For a brief period, Banta was a stop along the Lincoln Highway, the original cross-country thoroughfare linking the eastern and western United States. The highway was rerouted past Banta to nearby Tracy in 1915 via Eleventh Street, which was also known as U.S. Highway 50 for many years.

The historic J. Brichetto Building at 5362 West G Street, on the corner of South 7th Street across from the Banta Inn, was constructed by local landowner Giuseppe Brichetto in 1911 and served as a general store and the town's post office for many years.

Notable residents
 Steve Perry, former lead singer of the rock band Journey.
 Richard Pombo, former Congressman.

Government

References

Unincorporated communities in California
Unincorporated communities in San Joaquin County, California